Sean/Seán Mackin may refer to:

Seán Mackin (Irish republican), Northern Irish activist, fundraiser for the Friends of Sinn Féin
Sean Mackin (musician) (born 1979), American musician for the pop punk band Yellowcard
Sean Mackin, a fictional character from the Derek Landy novel Skulduggery Pleasant: Kingdom of the Wicked